Break is the fourth studio album by the American progressive rock band Enchant. It was released in 1998.

Track listing 
 "Break" (Music & Lyrics by Douglas Ott) – 5:04
 "King" (Music by Paul Craddick/Ott; Lyrics by Ott) – 4:34
 "My Enemy" (Music by Michael Geimer; Lyrics by Ted Leonard) – 6:58
 "Defenseless" (Music & Lyrics by Ott) – 4:54
 "The Lizard" (Music by Craddick/Ott; Lyrics by Craddick) – 4:45
 "Surrounded" (Music by Ott/Geimer; Lyrics by Ott) – 4:18
 "Silence" (Music & Lyrics by Ott) – 3:36
 "In the Dark" (Music by Craddick/Ott/Geimer; Lyrics by Craddick) – 5:49
 "My Gavel Hand" (Music by Ott; Lyrics by Leonard) – 5:05
 "The Cross" (Music & Lyrics by Craddick) – 6:58
 "Once a Week" (Bonus track) (Music & Lyrics by Leonard) - 6:24

Personnel 
 Ted Leonard – lead vocals; bass (track 1)
 Douglas A. Ott – guitars; backing vocals (tracks 1, 3), bass (tracks 2–4, 6–10)
 Mike "Benignus" Geimer – keyboards
 Paul Craddick – drums; piano (track 11)

Additional personnel 
  Bad Madsen – bass (track 5)
  Tony Mariano – bass (track 11)

Production 
 Paul Craddick – second engineer
 Thomas Ewerhard – artwork
 Kurt Foster – additional recording
 Ken Lee – mastering
 Douglas A. Ott – recording
 Tom Size – mixing

References 

1998 albums
Enchant (band) albums
Inside Out Music albums